The 1944 Detroit Lions season was their 15th in the league. The team improved on their previous season's output of 3–6–1, winning six games. They failed to qualify for the playoffs for the ninth consecutive season.

Schedule

Note: Intra-division opponents are in bold text.

Standings

References

External links
1944 Detroit Lions at Pro Football Reference
1944 Detroit Lions at jt-sw.com

Detroit Lions seasons
Detroit Lions
Detroit Lions